Stugeta is an Afrotropical genus of butterflies in the family Lycaenidae. The genus was erected by Hamilton Herbert Druce in 1891.

Species
Stugeta bowkeri (Trimen, 1864)
Stugeta carpenteri Stempffer, 1946
Stugeta marmoreus (Butler, 1866)
Stugeta mimetica Aurivillius, 1916
Stugeta occidentalis Stempffer & Bennett, 1958
Stugeta somalina Stempffer, 1946
Stugeta subinfuscata Grünberg, 1910

References

Iolaini
Lycaenidae genera
Taxa named by Hamilton Herbert Druce